The 1953–54 North Carolina Tar Heels men's basketball team represented the University of North Carolina at Chapel Hill. The head coach was Frank McGuire. The team played its home games at Woollen Gymnasium in Chapel Hill, North Carolina, and was a member of the Atlantic Coast Conference.

1953–54
Record:	11–10;	H:	7–3,	A:	4–3,	N:	1–4
ACC	5–6,	5th	Place

Coach:	Frank McGuire

Schedule and results 

|}

January 16	Virginia	H	W	78–66
January 19	NC State	H	L	77–84
February 2	Washington and Lee	LY	W	69–60
February 4	Duke (-/8)	A	L	47–63
February 8	Virginia	A	L	69–83
February 11	Wake Forest	H	L	62–76
February 13	Clemson (-/14)	A	W	72–56
February 16	Davidson	H	W	89–69
February 20	Duke (-/14)	H	L	63–67
February 24	NC State	A	L	48–57
February 27	The Citadel	A	W	79–52
ACC Tournament
March 4	NC State (-/18)	RAL	L	51–52

Roster

References 

North Carolina
North Carolina Tar Heels men's basketball seasons
Tar
Tar